Zhou  Duan is a former Chinese artistic gymnast. At the 1997 World Championships she won a silver medal on vault and a bronze medal with the Chinese team. At the 1997 East Asian Games she became the first female gymnast to perform the Gaylord II element – a forward tucked salto over high bar with ½ twist – on the uneven bars.

Zhou did not compete internationally for China after the 1997 World Championships. After retiring from gymnastics, she became a student at Beijing Sport University.

References

Chinese female artistic gymnasts
Medalists at the World Artistic Gymnastics Championships
Date of birth missing (living people)